Heliothea is a genus of moths in the family Geometridae erected by Jean Baptiste Boisduval in 1840.

Species
Heliothea discoidaria Boisduval, 1840 south-western Europe, Morocco
Heliothea iliensis Alphéraky, 1883 Tien Shan mountains

References

Geometridae